The All-Ireland Under-16 Ladies' Football Championship is a "knockout" competition in the game of Ladies' Gaelic football played by women in Ireland. The series of games are organised by the Ladies' Gaelic Football Association (Irish: Cumann Peil Gael na mBan) and are played during the summer months. All players have to be under 16 years of age.

Top winners

Roll of honour

Under-16 B Championship

Under-16 C Championship

References

Sources
 List of Under 16 Champions

Under-16 Ladies' Football Championship
Ladies' Gaelic football competitions
Under-16 sport